Pauline Parmentier was the defending champion, but lost in the final to Lourdes Domínguez Lino 3–6, 3–6.

Seeds

Draw

Finals

Top half

Bottom half

References
 Main Draw
 Qualifying Draw

Open GDF Suez de Marseille - Singles